Semnostola is a genus of moths belonging to the subfamily Olethreutinae of the family Tortricidae. It was described by Alexey Diakonoff in 1959.

Species
Semnostola arquatana Kuznetzov, 1988
Semnostola atrana Kuznetzov, 1988
Semnostola grandaedeaga Xu & Wang, 2006
Semnostola magnifica (Kuznetzov, 1964)
Semnostola mystica Diakonoff, 1959
Semnostola thrasyplaca (T. B. Fletcher, 1940)
Semnostola triangulata Nasu & Kogi, 1997
Semnostola trisignifera Kuznetzov, 1970

See also
List of Tortricidae genera

References

External links
Tortricidae.com

Tortricidae genera
Olethreutinae
Taxa named by Alexey Diakonoff